Panorama Senior High School is a public high school located on Van Nuys Boulevard in the Panorama City district of Los Angeles, California, United States.  Designed by architect DLR Group WWCOT, Panorama High School opened in 2006 to students in grades 9, 10, 11 and 12.  The school is a part of the Los Angeles Unified School District. The school serves the Panorama City, Arleta and Van Nuys sections of Los Angeles in the San Fernando Valley. Panorama High School's mascot is a python and the school colors are gold and black.

History
Panorama opened in fall 2006 with grades 9, 10, and 11, and then added 12th grade in 2007. In June 2008, the first students graduated from the school.  Panorama relieved overcrowding at Van Nuys High School, Birmingham High School, Monroe High School, and Polytechnic High School. The opening allowed for Van Nuys High School to return to a traditional calendar. Prior to having the name Panorama High School, the school was known as East Valley Area New High School #3.

The school had previously had a variety of after school classes within an after school program from October 2007 to June 2010. The after school classes were film production, dj music, urban art, sound art, etc. By September 2010, Panorama cancelled the after school classes, leaving only after school tutoring instead.

The first principal of Panorama High School, Sue Lepisto, retired in June 2010. She was replaced by Elias de la Torre in September 2010.

Athletics
The school has its own softball, baseball, water polo, football, basketball, soccer, volleyball, swimming, wrestling, and track teams. The school has two gymnasiums, a heated swimming pool, one fitness room, and a weight room.

City Championship Titles 

In 2010 the school gained its first city championship title; when the 2010 boys varsity water polo team, led by head coach Nick Samara, won third place in the CIF Los Angeles City Section. The school won its second championship title, after forming it first ever full girls wrestling team in 2013. Led by head coach Richard Ramos, and assistant coach Abby Herrera, the 2013 girls wrestling team won first place in the CIF Los Angeles City Section.

Filming
 Panorama High School served as the location of the Costa Verde High School for Heroes (NBC) in late 2007. It also was the studio for the High School Musical Film Series.

References

External links

 

High schools in Los Angeles
High schools in the San Fernando Valley
Panorama City, Los Angeles
Los Angeles Unified School District schools
Public high schools in California
Educational institutions established in 2006
2006 establishments in California